Macomb's Purchase is a large historical area of northern New York in the United States purchased from the state in 1791 by Alexander Macomb, a merchant who had become rich during the American Revolutionary War. He acted as a land speculator, selling off portions of this land.

History and geography
In 1792 in the aftermath of the Revolutionary War, the state of New York was struggling financially. It opened for sale nearly five million acres of land which state officials, under pressure from land speculators and other business interests, had forced the Iroquois tribes to cede. This was an enormous amount of land, about one-eighth of the entire state of New York. Convinced something illegal must have occurred, the New York State Legislature held exhaustive hearings into the land purchase, but no wrongdoing was uncovered.

Macomb, however, was unable to sell his land to settlers and developers fast enough to fund his massive purchase. He went bankrupt and was sentenced to debtor's prison six months after the purchase was made. Macomb sold  to Constable for 50,000 pounds (New York money), who six months later sold  to banker Samuel Ward for 100,000 pounds.  Ward, in turn, sold  to James Greenleaf, the son of a wealthy Bostonian merchant.

Constable subdivided his land into numerous plots. He found buyers worldwide for the property as well. The High Sheriff of London, England purchased  for a shilling an acre.

Greenleaf had purchased a cargo of tea from Rhode Island merchant John Brown (whose family funded and lent its name to Brown University). Greenleaf paid for the cargo partly in cash, and partly with the land he owned in New York. This  became known as Brown's Tract.

Description of the area
The tract included much of northern New York along the St. Lawrence River and eastern Lake Ontario (including the Thousand Islands). The purchase was eventually divided into 10 large townships. From this purchase are derived the deeds for all the lands that are now included in Lewis, Jefferson, and St. Lawrence counties, as well as portions of Franklin, Herkimer, and Oswego counties.

See also
 Castorland Company

References

Bibliography
Barlow, Jane A. Big Moose Lake in the Adirondacks: The Story of the Lake, the Land, and the People. Syracuse, N.Y.: Syracuse University Press, 2004.
Schneider, Paul. The Adirondacks: A History of America's First Wilderness. New York: Henry Holt and Co., 1997.

Geography of New York (state)